Pterophylla rutenbergii is a species of plant in the family Cunoniaceae endemic to Madagascar. The species is common and has a widespread distribution.  It can be found from sea level to the summits at Marojejy National Park. The species does best in open, disturbed habitat, particularly on roadsides and areas recently burned. The species exhibits high morphological plasticity, ranging from being shrub-like with small leaves at high altitudes to being a large canopy tree with large leaves in lowland areas.

References

Cunoniaceae
Endemic flora of Madagascar
Flora of the Madagascar lowland forests
Flora of the Madagascar subhumid forests